The 2014–15 FC Anzhi Makhachkala season was the club's first season back in the Football National League following their relegation in 2014. Anzhi Makhachkala finished the season in 2nd place, earning promotion back to the Russian Premier League at the first opportunity, whilst they also reached the Round of 32 in the Russian Cup where they were knocked out by Zenit St.Petersburg.

Squad

Transfers

In

Loans in

Out

Loans out

Released

Trials

Friendlies

FNL Cup

Final Series

Competitions

Overview

Football National League

Results summary

Results by round

Results

League table

Russian Cup

Squad statistics

Appearances and goals

|-
|colspan="14"|Players away from the club on loan:

|-
|colspan="14"|Players who appeared for Anzhi Makhachkala that left during the season:

|}

Goal scorers

Clean Sheets

Disciplinary record

References

External links
Official website
Fans' website 
A fan is a club Anji
Fans' website

FC Anzhi Makhachkala seasons
Anzhi Makhachkala